Exostoma peregrinator is a species of sisorid catfish from Thailand.

References

Catfish of Asia
Fish of Thailand
Taxa named by Heok Hee Ng
Taxa named by Chavalit Vidthayanon
Fish described in 2014
Sisoridae